Blackwood is a 1976 Canadian short documentary film about Newfoundland artist David Blackwood, directed by Tony Ianzelo and Andy Thomson for the National Film Board of Canada.

The film studies the works of Newfoundland’s David Blackwood (1941-2022), one of Canada’s greatest intaglio printmakers. Blackwood guides viewers through the process of etching, with step-by-step explanations. We see historical images of his home town of Wesleyville, and hear the tales of a seasoned seaman. 

Much of Blackwood’s work depicted Newfoundland outport life and industry, and we see some of his images of shipwrecks, seal hunting and iceberg encounters. Narration is in the dulcet tones of Newfoundland native Gordon Pinsent, and the cinematography has fine threads weaving, mingling, separating and disappearing, evoking a sense of history and a way of life long gone.

Awards
 Festival International du Film sur l'Art, Paris - Grand Prize for the Quality of the Image, 1977
 Festival of Tourist and Folklore Films, Brussels - Prize of the Principality of Monaco for the Best Film Evocating the Past of a Region by the Means of Art, 1977
 Yorkton Film Festival, Yorkton, Saskatchewan: Golden Sheaf Award, Best Short Film, 1977
 Yorkton Film Festival, Yorkton, Saskatchewan: Golden Sheaf Award, Best Sound Editing (to John Knight), 1977
 49th Academy Awards, Los Angeles – Nominee, Best Documentary Short Subject

References

External links

Watch Blackwood at NFB.ca

1976 films
1976 short films
1976 documentary films
Canadian short documentary films
Culture of Newfoundland and Labrador
Documentary films about painters
Films directed by Tony Ianzelo
Films set in Newfoundland and Labrador
Films produced by Tom Daly
Films produced by Colin Low (filmmaker)
National Film Board of Canada documentaries
National Film Board of Canada short films
Works about Newfoundland and Labrador
1970s short documentary films
1970s English-language films
1970s Canadian films